The Adolph Coors Company was formerly a holding company in Golden, Colorado controlled by the heirs of founder Adolph Coors. Its principal subsidiary was the Coors Brewing Company. The brewery was founded in 1873.

In 2005, Adolph Coors Co. merged with Molson, Inc. to become the Molson Coors Brewing Company.

Business names
Schueler & Coors, Golden Brewery (1873–1880)
Adolph Coors, Golden Brewery  (1880–1913)
Adolph Coors Co., Golden Brewery (1909–1913)
Adolph Coors Brewing and Malting Company, Golden Brewery (1913–1915)
Adolph Coors Company (1933–2005)

Chairmen
 Adolph Coors
 Adolph Coors III
 Joseph Coors
 Douglas Roy Coors
 William Coors
 Pete Coors, 2002–2004

Sponsorship history 
Coors was the main sponsor for the Coors Cycling Team (late 1980s to mid-1990s) and the sponsor for US cycling event the Coors Classic, which ran from 1980 to 1988.

Coors sponsored Premiership side Chelsea from 1994 to 1997. The last competitive game that the club wore shirts bearing Coors as sponsors was the 1997 FA Cup Final in which they beat Middlesbrough 2–0 to end their 26-year wait for a major trophy.

Coors became the official beer sponsor of NASCAR in 2008, following the departure of Anheuser-Busch.That company returned as an official partner in 2018. Coors was also a partner of the NFL until Bud Light replaced it in 2011. In addition to its official NASCAR sponsorship, Coors Light has regularly sponsored cars in the series. They sponsored Melling Racing, Team SABCO, and most recently Chip Ganassi Racing. Drivers to have Coors backing have included Bill Elliott, who won the Winston Million in 1985 and the 1988 Winston Cup Championship, Robby Gordon, Sterling Marlin, Kyle Petty, David Stremme and Regan Smith. From 2008 to 2017, Coors was the title sponsor of the pole award in the NASCAR Sprint Cup and Nationwide Series. Coors stopped sponsoring a stock car in 2008.

Coors holds the naming rights to Coors Field in Denver, Colorado, home of the Colorado Rockies baseball team.

Political influence 
According to Russ Bellant Coors family members have played a prominent role in American politics and public policy, supporting many conservative causes. Such causes included providing a $250,000 grant in 1973 to found The Heritage Foundation, an influential conservative think tank, and, via its parent company, the right-leaning think tank American Enterprise Institute. Joseph Coors was also known to have supported the Contras’ effort in Nicaragua during Reagan's presidency.

Chairman Pete Coors ran unsuccessfully for the United States Senate from Colorado in 2004 on the Republican ticket.

References

Further reading
 Banham, Russ. Coors: A Rocky Mountain Legend (1998). 
 Baron, Stanley. Brewed in America (1962)
 Baum, Dan.  Citizen Coors: A Grand Family Saga of Business, Politics, and Beer (2001). 
 Bellant, Russ. Coors Connection: How Coors Family Philanthropy Undermines Democratic Pluralism (1990). 
 Dansky, Eli. "Coors, Adolph" American National Biography (2003) online
 Downard, William L. Dictionary of the History of the American Brewing and Distilling Industries (1980). 
 Kostka, William.  The Pre-Prohibition History of Adolph Coors Company 1873–1933 (1973)

External links
 Denver Business Journal Article detailing the proposed merger

Coors Company, Adolph
Companies based in Golden, Colorado
Food and drink companies established in 1873
Food and drink companies disestablished in 2005
Molson Coors Beverage Company
Food and drink companies based in Colorado